In mathematical logic, a deduction theorem is a metatheorem that justifies doing conditional proofs from a hypothesis in systems that do not explicitly axiomatize that hypothesis, i.e. to prove an implication A → B, it is sufficient to assume A as an hypothesis and then proceed to derive B. Deduction theorems exist for both propositional logic and first-order logic. The deduction theorem is an important tool in Hilbert-style deduction systems because it permits one to write more comprehensible and usually much shorter proofs than would be possible without it. In certain other formal proof systems the same conveniency is provided by an explicit inference rule; for example natural deduction calls it implication introduction.

In the special case where  is the empty set, the deduction theorem claim can be more compactly written as:  implies . The deduction theorem for predicate logic is similar, but comes with some extra constraints (that would for example be satisfied if  is a closed formula). In general a deduction theorem needs to take into account all logical details of the theory under consideration, so each logical system technically needs its own deduction theorem, although the differences are usually minor.

The deduction theorem holds for all first-order theories with the usual deductive systems for first-order logic. However, there are first-order systems in which new inference rules are added for which the deduction theorem fails. Most notably, the deduction theorem fails to hold in Birkhoff–von Neumann quantum logic, because the linear subspaces of a Hilbert space form a  non-distributive lattice.

Examples of deduction

"Prove" axiom 1: P→(Q→P) {{efn|See  explanation of Notation § below.}}P 1. hypothesisQ 2. hypothesisP 3. reiteration of 1Q→P 4. deduction from 2 to 3P→(Q→P) 5. deduction from 1 to 4 QED
"Prove" axiom 2:P→(Q→R) 1. hypothesisP→Q 2. hypothesisP 3. hypothesisQ 4. modus ponens 3,2Q→R 5. modus ponens 3,1R 6. modus ponens 4,5P→R 7. deduction from 3 to 6
(P→Q)→(P→R) 8. deduction from 2 to 7
(P→(Q→R))→((P→Q)→(P→R)) 9. deduction from 1 to 8 QED
Using axiom 1 to show ((P→(Q→P))→R)→R:
(P→(Q→P))→R 1. hypothesisP→(Q→P) 2. axiom 1R 3. modus ponens 2,1
((P→(Q→P))→R)→R 4. deduction from 1 to 3 QED

Virtual rules of inference

From the examples, you can see that we have added three virtual (or extra and temporary) rules of inference to our normal axiomatic logic. These are "hypothesis", "reiteration", and "deduction". The normal rules of inference (i.e. "modus ponens" and the various axioms) remain available.

1. Hypothesis is a step where one adds an additional premise to those already available. So, if your previous step S was deduced as:

then one adds another premise H and gets:

This is symbolized by moving from the n-th level of indentation to the n+1-th level and saying S previous stepH hypothesis

2. Reiteration is a step where one re-uses a previous step. In practice, this is only necessary when one wants to take a hypothesis that is not the most recent hypothesis and use it as the final step before a deduction step.

3. Deduction is a step where one removes the most recent hypothesis (still available) and prefixes it to the previous step. This is shown by unindenting one level as follows:H hypothesis
......... (other steps)C (conclusion drawn from H)H→C deduction

Conversion from proof using the deduction meta-theorem to axiomatic proof
In axiomatic versions of propositional logic, one usually has among the axiom schemas (where P, Q, and R are replaced by any propositions):
Axiom 1 is: P→(Q→P)
Axiom 2 is: (P→(Q→R))→((P→Q)→(P→R))
Modus ponens is: from P and P→Q infer QThese axiom schemas are chosen to enable one to derive the deduction theorem from them easily. So it might seem that we are begging the question. However, they can be justified by checking that they are tautologies using truth tables and that modus ponens preserves truth.

From these axiom schemas one can quickly deduce the theorem schema P→P (reflexivity of implication), which is used below:
 (P→((Q→P)→P))→((P→(Q→P))→(P→P)) from axiom schema 2 with P, (Q→P), P P→((Q→P)→P) from axiom schema 1 with P, (Q→P)
 (P→(Q→P))→(P→P) from modus ponens applied to step 2 and step 1
 P→(Q→P) from axiom schema 1 with P, Q P→P from modus ponens applied to step 4 and step 3

Suppose that we have that Γ and H together prove C, and we wish to show that Γ proves H→C. For each step S in the deduction that is a premise in Γ (a reiteration step) or an axiom, we can apply modus ponens to the axiom 1, S→(H→S), to get H→S. If the step is H itself (a hypothesis step), we apply the theorem schema to get H→H. If the step is the result of applying modus ponens to A and A→S, we first make sure that these have been converted to H→A and H→(A→S) and then we take the axiom 2, (H→(A→S))→((H→A)→(H→S)), and apply modus ponens to get (H→A)→(H→S) and then again to get H→S. At the end of the proof we will have H→C as required, except that now it only depends on Γ, not on H. So the deduction step will disappear, consolidated into the previous step which was the conclusion derived from H.

To minimize the complexity of the resulting proof, some preprocessing should be done before the conversion. Any steps (other than the conclusion) that do not actually depend on H should be moved up before the hypothesis step and unindented one level. And any other unnecessary steps (which are not used to get the conclusion or can be bypassed), such as reiterations that are not the conclusion, should be eliminated.

During the conversion, it may be useful to put all the applications of modus ponens to axiom 1 at the beginning of the deduction (right after the H→H step).

When converting a modus ponens, if A is outside the scope of H, then it will be necessary to apply axiom 1, A→(H→A), and modus ponens to get H→A. Similarly, if A→S is outside the scope of H, apply axiom 1, (A→S)→(H→(A→S)), and modus ponens to get H→(A→S). It should not be necessary to do both of these, unless the modus ponens step is the conclusion, because if both are outside the scope, then the modus ponens should have been moved up before H and thus be outside the scope also.

Under the Curry–Howard correspondence, the above conversion process for the deduction meta-theorem is analogous to the conversion process from lambda calculus terms to terms of combinatory logic, where axiom 1 corresponds to the K combinator, and axiom 2 corresponds to the S combinator.  Note that the I combinator corresponds to the theorem schema P→P.

 Helpful theorems 
If one intends to convert a complicated proof using the deduction theorem to a straight-line proof not using the deduction theorem, then it would probably be useful to prove these theorems once and for all at the beginning and then use them to help with the conversion:

helps convert the hypothesis steps.

helps convert modus ponens when the major premise is not dependent on the hypothesis, replaces axiom 2 while avoiding a use of axiom 1.

helps convert modus ponens when the minor premise is not dependent on the hypothesis, replaces axiom 2 while avoiding a use of axiom 1.

These two theorems jointly can be used in lieu of axiom 2, although the converted proof would be more complicated:

Peirce's law is not a consequence of the deduction theorem, but it can be used with the deduction theorem to prove things that one might not otherwise be able to prove.

It can also be used to get the second of the two theorems, which can used in lieu of axiom 2.

Proof of the deduction theorem

We prove the deduction theorem in a Hilbert-style deductive system of propositional calculus.

We want to prove that .

If n = 1 then  is member of the set of formulas .

Then there are two possibilities:

 is member of the set of formulas ; in this case we proceed as for n=1.
 is arrived at by using modus ponens. By the axiom (p → (q → r)) → ((p → q) → (p → r)) with substitution it follows that  , and by using modus ponens twice we have .

Thus in all cases the theorem holds also for n+1, and by induction the deduction theorem is proven.

The deduction theorem in predicate logic
The deduction theorem is also valid in first-order logic in the following form:

Here, the symbol  means "is a syntactical consequence of." We indicate below how the proof of this deduction theorem differs from that of the deduction theorem in propositional calculus.

In the most common versions of the notion of formal proof, there are, in addition to the axiom schemes
of propositional calculus (or the understanding that all tautologies of propositional calculus are to
be taken as axiom schemes in their own right), quantifier axioms, and in addition to modus ponens, one additional rule of inference, known as the rule of generalization: "From K, infer ∀vK."

In order to convert a proof of G from T∪{F} to one of F→G from T, one deals 
with steps of the proof of G that are axioms or result from application of modus ponens in the 
same way as for proofs in propositional logic. Steps that result from application of the rule of
generalization are dealt with via the following quantifier axiom (valid whenever the variablev is not free in formula H):

(∀v(H→K))→(H→∀vK).

Since in our case F is assumed to be closed, we can take H to be F. This axiom allows
one to deduce F→∀vK from F→K and generalization, which is just what is needed whenever
the rule of generalization is applied to some K in the proof of G.

Example of conversion
To illustrate how one can convert a natural deduction to the axiomatic form of proof, we apply it to the tautology Q→((Q→R)→R). In practice, it is usually enough to know that we could do this. We normally use the natural-deductive form in place of the much longer axiomatic proof.

First, we write a proof using a natural-deduction like method:Q 1. hypothesisQ→R 2. hypothesisR 3. modus ponens 1,2
(Q→R)→R 4. deduction from 2 to 3Q→((Q→R)→R) 5. deduction from 1 to 4 QED

Second, we convert the inner deduction to an axiomatic proof:
(Q→R)→(Q→R) 1. theorem schema (A→A)
((Q→R)→(Q→R))→(((Q→R)→Q)→((Q→R)→R)) 2. axiom 2
((Q→R)→Q)→((Q→R)→R) 3. modus ponens 1,2Q→((Q→R)→Q) 4. axiom 1Q 5. hypothesis
(Q→R)→Q 6. modus ponens 5,4
(Q→R)→R 7. modus ponens 6,3Q→((Q→R)→R) 8. deduction from 5 to 7 QED

Third, we convert the outer deduction to an axiomatic proof:
(Q→R)→(Q→R) 1. theorem schema (A→A)
((Q→R)→(Q→R))→(((Q→R)→Q)→((Q→R)→R)) 2. axiom 2
((Q→R)→Q)→((Q→R)→R) 3. modus ponens 1,2Q→((Q→R)→Q) 4. axiom 1
[((Q→R)→Q)→((Q→R)→R)]→[Q→(((Q→R)→Q)→((Q→R)→R))] 5. axiom 1Q→(((Q→R)→Q)→((Q→R)→R)) 6. modus ponens 3,5
[Q→(((Q→R)→Q)→((Q→R)→R))]→([Q→((Q→R)→Q)]→[Q→((Q→R)→R))]) 7. axiom 2
[Q→((Q→R)→Q)]→[Q→((Q→R)→R))] 8. modus ponens 6,7Q→((Q→R)→R)) 9. modus ponens 4,8 QED

These three steps can be stated succinctly using the Curry–Howard correspondence:
first, in lambda calculus, the function f = λa. λb. b a has type q → (q → r) → r''
second, by lambda elimination on b, f = λa. s i (k a)
third, by lambda elimination on a, f = s (k (s i)) k

See also
 Cut-elimination theorem
 Conditional proof
 Currying
 Propositional calculus
 Peirce's law

Notes

References
  September/October 2008
 
 
 .

External links 
 Introduction to Mathematical Logic by Vilnis Detlovs and Karlis Podnieks is a comprehensive tutorial.  See Section 1.5.
 "Deduction Theorem"

Theorem
Metatheorems
Proof theory
Theorems in the foundations of mathematics